Thimbleby, with its variant Thymbleby, is an English surname. Notable people with this surname include the following:

 Harold Thimbleby (born 1955), English computer scientist
 Neil Thimbleby (born 1939), New Zealand rugby union player
 Stephen Thymbleby (died 1587), English politician

English-language surnames